Eldorado is an unincorporated community in Clay County, Nebraska, United States.

History
Eldorado is derived from a Spanish name meaning "golden" and the community was so named by account of its golden soil. A post office was established at El Dorado in 1888, and remained in operation until it was discontinued in 1942.

References

Populated places in Clay County, Nebraska
Unincorporated communities in Nebraska